Signal Mountain is an isolated summit standing  above sea level. The mountain is located in Grand Teton National Park in the U.S. state of Wyoming. The next closest higher summit is more than  distant, and this isolation provides sweeping views of the Teton Range, much of the northern Jackson Hole area as well as the Snake River. Though located adjacent to the Tetons, Signal Mountain was not formed in the same manner or period. The mountain originally was formed by volcanic ashfall from one of the eruptions of the Yellowstone hotspot. The peak is also partially a glacial moraine formed by a receding glacier that came south out of the Yellowstone icecap. This same glacier also created neighboring Jackson Lake.

The trails then rejoin and steepen over the last mile to reach the secondary summit of the mountain, the Jackson Lake Overlook. The trail is a hiking only trail, mountain biking and horseback riding are not permitted by the park service. The road is a popular biking destination due to the difficult climb up and then (after turning around at the summit) continuous downhill experienced on a  portion of the road.

See also
 Geology of the Grand Teton area

References

Mountains of Grand Teton National Park
Mountains of Wyoming
Mountains of Teton County, Wyoming